Isaac Williams (1799–1856) was an American fur trapper, merchant, later a rancher and owner of Rancho Santa Ana del Chino in what is now the cities of Chino and Chino Hills in San Bernardino County, California.

Isaac Williams was born near Scranton, Pennsylvania, and had resided in Ohio and Missouri before leaving Fort Smith in 1831 with the Bean-Sinclair trapping party for the Rocky Mountains. At Taos he joined the Ewing Young fur trapping expedition that arrived in Los Angeles, Alta California, on April 14, 1832. Williams remained there, where he became known as Julian by the locals, and worked as a merchant before he married Maria de Jesus Lugo, daughter of the ranchero Antonio Maria Lugo in 1839.

In 1841, Isaac Williams built a large adobe home on the  Rancho Santa Ana del Chino, which his wife acquired from his father-in-law Antonio Lugo. After bearing three children, Maria de Jesus died in childbirth in 1842. The following year, an addition to the rancho of three square leagues (for a total of eight square leagues) was granted by Governor Micheltorena to Williams.

During the Mexican–American War the Battle of Chino occurred at the adobe on September 26–27, 1846, during which 24 Americans including Williams were captured by a group of about 50 Californios.

During the time of the California Gold Rush, Williams having experienced the rigors of crossing the Mojave Desert with the Young party, his rancho became a stop and a source of aid for travelers on the Mormon Road to California. Williams would send help to travelers on the desert road who were starving or had lost their animals, giving the travelers or their rescue parties food and sometimes horses or mules, or sent his own men out into the desert to do so. Located on the Southern Emigrant Trail, the adobe became a stop and later an inn famous for its hospitality to parties of Forty-niners and later travelers.

Williams died at his home in 1856.

References

History of Los Angeles
History of San Bernardino County, California
Businesspeople from Scranton, Pennsylvania
Naturalized citizens of Mexican California
1799 births
1856 deaths
California pioneers
19th-century American businesspeople